Ardozyga tetraploa is a species of moth in the family Gelechiidae. It was described by Edward Meyrick in 1904. It is found in Australia, where it has been recorded from Victoria.

The forewings are dark fuscous with a very broad ochreous-white transverse fascia extending from near the base to one-third and with an ochreous-white costal dot beyond the middle, as well as a rather narrow ochreous-white inwards-curved fascia from two-thirds of the costa to before the tornus. The hindwings are grey, darker towards apex.

References

Ardozyga
Moths described in 1904
Taxa named by Edward Meyrick
Moths of Australia